Mnguni was the leader of the Nguni nation in who reached Southern Africa migrating from the North and also the father of King Xhosa. The Xhosa people, today considered a sub-nation of the Nguni nation, were historically referred to as AbeNguni. Mnguni's name derives from the word Nguni, the name for the major ethnicity in South Africa. It now  includes the Zulus, Xhosas, Ndebeles and Swazis among others.

Most of the different Nguni-tribes trace their lineage to Mnguni, the King of the unified (pre-Zulu, pre-Xhosa, pre-Ndebele, pre-Swazi etc.) Nguni nation in South Africa. Xhosa kings trace their lineage to Mnguni, as the founder of the Xhosa Kingdom was his heir Xhosa.

Mnguni means "belonging to Nguni(Nguni being the founder) or belonging to the Nguni nation". 
Mnguni Lethukuthula, (son of well-known Raymond S Mnguni) from Newcastle, Osizweni (KwaZulu-Natal) claims to be the prince and the upcoming leader of the Nguni clan.

References

:fr:Chefs des Zoulous avant 1816#Mnguni

South African mythology
Legendary monarchs
Zulu mythology
Zulu kings
Legendary progenitors
Founding monarchs